is a mountain located in the cities of Yōrō and Ōgaki, Gifu Prefecture, Japan. Its peak rises  and is the main peak in the Yōrō Mountains that stretch through the region. It was previously called Mount Tagi (多芸山 Tagi-yama).

There is a large park with many attractions between the town of Yōrō and the mountain. From the park, there are trails to the Yōrō waterfall and to the summit of the mountain.

Reaching the summit
There are two options for reaching the summit. The easiest way to reach the summit is to take the Yōrō Ropeway from the parking lot above Yōrō Falls. The second option is to hike up the mountain using trails that also begin from the parking lot above Yōrō Falls. There is a record book in which climbers can sign their name to record their journey.

Access 
The town of Yōrō is on the Kintetsu Yōrō Line. It can be reached from Ōgaki in the north, or from Kuwana in the south. Ōgaki is on the JR Tōkaidō Main Line.

Gallery

See also 

 Yōrō Mountains
 Yōrō Waterfall
 Yōrō, Gifu

References

External links 
 Yōrō-chō Tourist Sightseeing Association 
 Mount Yōrō Hiking Map 

Yoro, Mount
Yōrō, Gifu